Autry is a commune in the Ardennes department in the Grand Est region of north-eastern France.

The inhabitants of the commune are known as Autryens or Autryennes.

Geography

Autry is located some 50 km east of Reims and 25 km north by north-west of Sainte-Menehould. The southern border of the commune is the departmental boundary between Ardennes and Marne. Access to the commune is by road D21 from Challerange in the north-west which passes through the centre of the commune and the village and continues to Binarville in the south-east after changing to the D63 at the departmental border. The D218 goes west from the village to Bouconville and the D41 goes north-east to Lançon. Apart from the village there is the hamlet of La Gare in the west. Large areas of the commune are forested, especially in the west, and there is a large fish farm in the east. The rest of the commune is farmland.

The Aisne river forms part of the south-eastern border of the commune as it flows north then west to the village then north again as it continues its journey to join the Oise at Compiègne. The Dormoise flows from the south-west to join the Aisne in the commune. The Remy Galere rises on the northern border and flows east to join the Aisne forming part of the northern border.

Neighbouring communes and villages

Heraldry

Administration

List of Successive Mayors

Demography
In 2017 the commune had 117 inhabitants.

Culture and heritage

Civil heritage
The commune has one structure that is registered as an historical monument:
A Flour Mill (20th century)

Another site of interest
Around the church in the village there are traces of a medieval fortification system.

Notable people linked to the commune
Louis Marie Alphonse Depuiset (1822-1886), Entomologist.

See also
Communes of the Ardennes department

References

External links
Autry on the old IGN website 
Autry on Géoportail, National Geographic Institute (IGN) website 
Autry on the 1750 Cassini Map

Communes of Ardennes (department)